Chella Pillai is a 1955 Indian Tamil-language comedy drama film directed by M. V. Raman and produced by A. V. Meiyappan of AVM Productions. The film script was written by Javar Seetharaman. Music was composed by R. Sudarsanam. It stars K. R. Ramasamy and Savitri, with T. S. Balaiah, B. R. Panthulu, P. Kannamba, Pandari Bai, K. A. Thangavelu, Javar Seetharaman and Kaka Radhakrishnan in supporting roles. The film was remade in Telugu as Vadina (1955).

Plot 

Mani is an orphan brought up by his brother and his wife. Fond of the growing child, she covers for all mischievous deeds, even petty crimes, without bothering to correct him. Soon, he grows into an irresponsible young man addicted to gambling. He meets a young woman Lalitha, who dreams of becoming a movie star. He promises to introduce her to movies. Meanwhile, the family decides to get him married to a modest young Anjalai in the hope that he would become better human being. The hero leaves home to make a movie with the young woman. Needing money for the productions, he commits a theft in the shop where his brother works, resulting in the kind man losing his job. The hero gets involved in the printing of fakes notes and when the brothers seek his help. He gives him the counterfeit currency, resulting in the poor man getting arrested. How the erring hero changes his ways forms the rest of the plot.

Cast 
 K. R. Ramasamy as Mani
 Savitri as Dancer Lalitha
 T. S. Balaiah as Yaman
 B. R. Panthulu as Paramasivam
 P. Kannamba as Kalyani
 K. A. Thangavelu as Avatharam
 Pandari Bai as Anjalai
 Javar Seetharaman as Madabova
 Kaka Radhakrishnan
 P. D. Sambandam as Murugan
 C. V. V. Panthulu as Deena Dhayalan
 Vadhiraj as Nalan, Mani's friend

Soundtrack 
Music was by R. Sudarsanam and lyrics were written by Udumalai Narayana Kavi, K. P. Kamakshi, Ku. Ma. Balasubramaniam and V. Seetharaman.

References

External links 
 

1950s Tamil-language films
1955 comedy-drama films
1955 films
AVM Productions films
Films directed by M. V. Raman
Films with screenplays by Javar Seetharaman
Indian black-and-white films
Indian comedy-drama films
Tamil films remade in other languages
Films scored by R. Sudarsanam